Lee Stewart Richardson (25 April 1979 – 13 May 2012) was a British international motorcycle speedway rider.

Career
Richardson represented Great Britain at senior and under-21 level and featured in several World Cup tournaments. Richardson was World Under 21 champion in 1999 and also won the Elite League Riders' Championship in 2003. 

In October 2002, during the Speedway Grand Prix Qualification he won the GP Challenge, which ensured that he claimed a permanent slot for the 2003 Grand Prix.

He was also a fully fledged Grand Prix rider for four seasons from 2003 until 2006. Richardson joined the Lakeside Hammers for the 2009 season.

Death
On 13 May 2012, Richardson died of internal bleeding in a Wrocław hospital following a collision with a safety fence during a Polish League match.

Family
Richardson's mother Julie was a presenter for ScreenSport Television. His father Colin is a former rider. His uncle Steve Weatherley, another rider, was paralysed in a crash with Vic Harding whilst racing in a meeting at the Hackney Wick Stadium (Harding later died in hospital).

Speedway Grand Prix results

References

1979 births
2012 deaths
British speedway riders
Sportspeople from Hastings
Coventry Bees riders
Poole Pirates riders
Reading Racers riders
Swindon Robins riders
Lakeside Hammers riders
Eastbourne Eagles riders
Motorcycle racers who died while racing
Sport deaths in Poland
Filmed deaths in motorsport